Shanta is a character in the Rāmāyaṇa. She is the adoptive daughter of King Romapāda of Aṅga and wife of R̥śyaśr̥ṇga. In northern recensions of the Rāmāyaṇa and later Indian literature, she is the daughter of Daśaratha who is then adopted by Romapāda.

Life
She was educated in the Vedas, arts, craft as well as in warfare, and was considered to have been very beautiful. One day, while her father, the king Romapada, was busy in conversation with Shanta, a brahmin came to ask for help in cultivation in the days of the monsoon. Romapada did not pay attention to the brahmin's plight. This irritated and enraged the brahmin, who left the kingdom. Indra, the god of rain, was unable to bear the insult to his devotee, so there was little rainfall during the monsoon season resulting in drought in the kingdom. Meanwhile, Dasharatha wanted a son to continue his legacy and enrich his royal dynasty. It was advised that the troubles of both kingdoms could only be alleviated by yajnas performed by a brahmin with powers that come from the observance of perfect chastity and that the only such person was Rishyasringa.

Rishyasringa had been raised by Vibhandak Rishi, isolated from society without knowledge of women. He had to be brought to the city and be persuaded to carry out the necessary yajna ceremonies. Despite their fear of the power and anger of Vibhandak Rishi, both kings send young women to introduce the boy to the normal society, then Shanta fulfils this task and Rishyasringa marries Shanta, he then agrees to perform yajna for Anga, during the recitation of it, it rained heavily, the public rejoiced and there were festivals in Anga.

Rishyasringa also performed a Putra Kameshthi yajna for Dasharatha to beget progeny, and as the consequence of the said Yajna was born: Rama, Bharata, and the twins Lakshmana and Shatrughna. There is a temple at Kigga, a small town near Sringeri, Karnataka, where idols of Shringa Rishi and Goddess Shanta are hosted. Shanta is said to have nursed Dasharatha on his death bed.

References

Characters in the Ramayana
Solar dynasty